Halopteris may refer to:
 Halopteris (hydrozoan), a genus of hydrozoa in the family Halopterididae
 Halopteris (protist), a genus of protists in the family Stypocaulaceae